"We Made It" is a promo single by rapper Busta Rhymes featuring the rock band Linkin Park.

We Made It may also refer to:

 "We Made It" (Louis Tomlinson song)
 "We Made It", a song by Soulja Boy from The King
 "We Made It", a song by Tito Jackson
 "We Made It", a song by Toto from Toto IV
 We Made It, a fictional planet in Larry Niven's Known Space universe

See also 
 "Looks Like We Made It", a song by Barry Manilow